A left inverse in mathematics may refer to:

 A left inverse element with respect to a binary operation on a set
 A left inverse function for a mapping between sets
 A kind of generalized inverse

See also 
 Left-cancellative
 Loop (algebra), an algebraic structure with identity element where every element has a unique left and right inverse
 Retraction (category theory), a left inverse of some morphism
 Right inverse (disambiguation)